Moses Dunbar (June 3, 1746 – March 19, 1777) was Connecticut land-owner and officer in a Loyalist regiment during the American Revolutionary War, who became one of the few men in the state of Connecticut to be convicted of high treason and executed.

Early life
Moses Dunbar was born in Wallingford, Connecticut, on June 3, 1746 to John and Temperance Dunbar. In 1764, Moses married Pheobe Jerome of Farmington, Connecticut. Soon after marriage, Moses and Phoebe joined the Church of England.

Involvement in the American Revolution
On May 26, 1776, Dunbar's wife Phoebe died after months of illness. Dunbar subsequently married Esther Adams. In September, Dunbar traveled to Long Island and, in October, he accepted a commission as a Captain in the King's American Regiment, a British provincial regiment which was raised for Loyalist service. He then went back to Farmington, Connecticut, and was trying to persuade some other young men to enlist in the British army when he was arrested, and his royal commission and a list of Loyalist recruits was found in his pocket.

He was indicted for high treason, tried in the superior court in Hartford, Connecticut, and on January 23, 1777, found guilty. on March 19, he was executed on the gallows which stood near the present site of Trinity College. Dunbar is interred at the Ancient Burying ground, in Hartford.

Notes

References

External links
Capt Moses Dunbar at Find A Grave 
Moses Dunbar, The Other Connecticut Man Hanged in the Revolution
Nathan Hale & Moses Dunbar – Two Very Different Victims From Revolutionary America

People executed for treason against the United States
American Revolutionary War executions
1746 births
1777 deaths
People from Wallingford, Connecticut
Loyalists in the American Revolution from Connecticut
Loyalist military personnel of the American Revolutionary War
People executed by the United States by hanging